Chanson pour boire and chanson à boire are terms for French drinking songs, frequently coupled with  chanson pour danser (or "song for dancing"). It was used in from about 1627–1670. It is different from the air à boire primarily by the period the term was used, and that chansons pour boire are usually for one voice with lute accompaniment, and airs à boire are for multiple voices with lute accompaniment. Both are fairly simple; strophic, with syllabic settings of light texts. The texts are usually about drinking and are humorous.

See also
Chanson paillarde, popular French songs with a sexual and humorous content.

References
John H. Baron. "Chanson pour boire", Grove Music Online, ed. L. Macy (accessed December 2, 2006), grovemusic.com (subscription access).

Notes

17th-century music genres
Song forms
French music history
Baroque music